Events from the year 1401 in France

Incumbents
 Monarch – Charles VI

Events

Births
 27 October – Catherine of Valois, Queen of England (died 1437)
 Unknown – Charles I, Duke of Bourbon, nobleman and soldier (died 1456)

Deaths
 Unknown – John of Valois, Count of Montpensier, nobleman (born 1386)

References

1400s in France